The Exciting New Organ of Don Patterson is the debut album by organist Don Patterson recorded in 1964 and released on the Prestige label.

Reception

Allmusic awarded the album 4½ stars stating simply "Great album with Booker Ervin on tenor sax".

Track listing 
 "S'Bout Time" (Don Patterson) - 11:00  
 "Up In Betty's Room" (Billy James, Don Patterson) - 5:10  
 "Oleo" (Sonny Rollins) - 3:00  
 "When Johnny Comes Marching Home" (Traditional) - 10:50  
 "The Good Life" (Sacha Distel, Jean Broussolle) - 9:50

Personnel 
Don Patterson - organ
Booker Ervin - tenor saxophone 
Billy James - drums

References 

Don Patterson (organist) albums
Booker Ervin albums
1964 debut albums
Prestige Records albums
Albums produced by Ozzie Cadena
Albums recorded at Van Gelder Studio